Glåpen Lighthouse is a coastal lighthouse in Moskenes Municipality in Nordland county, Norway.  The lighthouse sits on the southeastern shore of the island of Moskenesøya, just south of the village of Sørvågen on the northern coast of the Vestfjorden.

History
The Glåpen Lighthouse was first established in 1857. The tower is white with a red top.

The occulting light flashes red or white (depending on the direction) once every six seconds. The tower is painted white with one black horizontal band and the roof on the light is red.

See also

Lighthouses in Norway
List of lighthouses in Norway

References

External links
 Norsk Fyrhistorisk Forening 
 Picture of the Glåpen Lighthouse

Lighthouses completed in 1857
Moskenes
Lighthouses in Nordland
1857 establishments in Norway